Héctor Eugenio Noguera Illanes (born July 8, 1937 in Santiago), is a Chilean television, theatre and film actor, and also a theatre director.

Noguera is the son of Héctor Noguera Prieto (grandson of José Joaquín Prieto Vial and Yolanda Illanes Benítez. He studied at Colegio San Ignacio school and graduated from Pontificia Universidad Católica de Chile. He was married to Isidora Portales and they had two daughters, Amparo and Piedad. Later, he married Claudia Berger and had three children with her, Diego, Emilia and Damián. Héctor debuted on the fotonovelas "Ecran" and "Cine Amor" in the 1960s and on the film El Chacal de Nahueltoro (1969) directed by Miguel Littín.

Noguera is best known for his telenovelas at TVN like "Sucupira", "Romané", "Pampa ilusión", and others. In 2003, he joined Canal 13 with Machos, which was a great success. He won the APES (Asociación de Periodistas de Espectáculos) award for "Best Actor" in 1996, 2000 and 2003 for his roles in "Sucupira", "Romané" and "Machos", respectively. In 2015, the Havana Film Festival New York awarded him the Havana Star Prize for "Best Actor" for his role in the Uruguayan film Mr. Kaplan. Currently, he is part of Chilevisión where he recorded "Sin Anestesia" (2009) and "Mujeres de Lujo" (2010). 

In 2015 he received Chile's National Prize for Performing and Audiovisual Arts.

Filmography

Telenovelas
 1972 - La Sal del Desierto (TVN) - Bernardo Covarrubias
 1985 - Matrimonio de Papel (Canal 13) - Javier Moyano
 1988 - Semidiós (Canal 13) - Ponce
 1992 - Trampas y Caretas (TVN) - Américo
 1993 - Ámame (TVN) - Américo de Bantes
 1994 - Rompecorazón (TVN) - Alvaro Sulivan/Mario Barrientos
 1995 - Estúpido Cupido (TVN) - Obispo
 1996 - Sucupira (TVN) - Federico Valdivieso
 1997 - Oro Verde (TVN) - Ignacio Meyer
 2000 - Romané (TVN) - Melquiades Antich
 2001 - Pampa Ilusión (TVN) - William Clark
 2003 - Machos (Canal 13) - Ángel Mercader
 2004 - Tentación (Canal 13) - Julián Domínguez
 2006 - Descarado (Canal 13) - Franco Miretti
 2006 - Huaiquimán y Tolosa (Canal 13) - Carlos Montoya
 2007 - Heroes - Ambrosio O'Higgins
 2007 - 2008 - Lola (Canal 13) - Carlos Aguirre
 2009 - Sin Anestesia (CHV) - Dr. Alfonso Valenzuela
 2010 - Mujeres de Lujo (CHV) - Ronny Palma
 2011 - Infiltradas (CHV) - Faustino Santo Domingo
 2012 - La Sexóloga (CHV) - Hernán "Nano" Hidalgo
 2014 - Las 2 Carolinas (CHV) - Rolando Vallejos
 2017 - Perdona nuestros pecados (Mega) - Obispo Subercaseaux

Films
 1961 - Deja que los perros ladren, directed by Naúm Kramarenco
 1969 - El chacal de Nahueltoro, directed by Miguel Littín - Chaplain
 1972 - State of Siege, directed by Costa-Gavras - Tupamaro leader (uncredited)
 1983 - The Compass Rose, directed by Patricio Guzmán
 1988 - Imagen latente
 1991 - La frontera, directed by Ricardo Larraín - Father Patricio
 2000 - 30 ans, directed by Laurent Perrin - Luis Miguel Suerte
 2003 - Sub Terra, directed by Marcelo Ferrari - Luis Cousiño
 2006 - Fuga, directed by Pablo Larraín - Klaus Roth
 2008 - Desierto sur, directed by Shawn Garry - Iñaki Martiarena
 2008 - El regalo, directed by Cristián Galaz and Andrea Ugalde - Nicolás
 2014 - Mr. Kaplan, directed by Álvaro Brechner - Jacobo
 2016 - Neruda, directed by Pablo Larraín

References

External links
 

1937 births
Chilean male film actors
Chilean male telenovela actors
Chilean male television actors
Chilean theatre directors
Chilean people of French descent
Living people
People from Santiago
Pontifical Catholic University of Chile alumni